Parer or parer may refer to:

Items used for paring 

 Pencil sharpener, called a 'parer' in some countries
 Peeler, a specialized kitchen tool used to remove the outer layer (pare) of some vegetables and fruits
 Paring knife, a small all-purpose kitchen knife with a plain edge

People 

 Damien Parer, an Australian war photographer
 David Parer, an Australian natural history film maker
 Ray Parer, an Australian aviator
 Warwick Parer, an Australian politician

Other 

 Parer, one of six house names in Chisholm Catholic College